Rovio Animation, Ltd. is the animation division of Kaiken Entertainment after it was acquired from its original owner, Rovio Entertainment, in March 2017. It is led by former Rovio CEO Mikael Hed.

Sony Pictures Television carries distribution for their television productions after their works on The Angry Birds Movie.

Filmography

Television series

Feature films

References

2012 establishments
Finnish animation studios
Angry Birds